Carl Eytel (September 12, 1862 – September 17, 1925) was a German American artist who built his reputation for paintings and drawings of desert subjects in the American Southwest. Immigrating to the United States in 1885, he settled in Palm Springs, California in 1903. With an extensive knowledge of the Sonoran Desert, Eytel traveled with the author George Wharton James as he wrote the successful Wonders of the Colorado Desert, and contributed over 300 drawings to the 1908 work. While he enjoyed success as an artist, he lived as an ascetic and would die in poverty. Eytel's most important work, Desert Near Palm Springs, hangs in the History Room of the California State Library.

Life

Early life and immigration
Carl Eytel was born as Karl Adolf Wilhelm Eytel in Maichingen, Böblingen to Tusnelda (née Schmid) and Friederick Hermann Eytel, a Lutheran minister in the Kingdom of Württemberg (now the state of Baden-Württemberg, near Stuttgart), Germany. As a boy, he became a ward of his grandfather when his father died. Eytel was well educated in the German gymnasium and became enamored of the American West while reading the works of Prussian natural science writer and explorer Alexander von Humboldt, which he found in the Stuttgart Royal Library. From 1880 to 1884 he studied forestry in Tübingen and then was drafted into the German Army. He first traveled to the United States in 1885 aboard the Suevia and worked as a ranch hand in Kansas. Later he worked at a slaughterhouse for 18 months to earn his living and to study cattle. In 1891, he read an article about the Palm Springs area in the San Francisco Call and was "incited" to visit the California desert.

Palm Springs
Eytel returned to Germany to study art for 18 months (1897–1898) at the Royal Art School Stuttgart and then re-immigrated to the United States. Wanting to be a cowboy, he worked as a cowhand in the San Joaquin Valley and in 1903 he would settle in Palm Springs. Living in small cabins he built himself, Palm Springs would remain his home. Eytel often walked on his travels, covering 400 miles in the Colorado Desert on foot. On one of his travels, he was nearly lynched as a horse thief, and in 1918, during a trip to northern Arizona, he was threatened with lynching as a German spy.

Work

While living for the most part as a "desert rat" and starving artist, he both traveled alone throughout the American Southwest and accompanied author J. Smeaton Chase and painter Jimmy Swinnerton on their travels. Serving as George Wharton James' guide to "every obvious and obscure location of importance", he illustrated James' two volume The Wonders of the Colorado Desert. The work was successful and received generally favorable reviews. The collaboration on the book lasted from 1903 to 1907. Eytel's illustrations were also used by James in his 1906 article "The Colorado Desert: As General Kearney Saw It".

Successes
By 1908 Eytel was exhibiting works in Pasadena and enjoying the patronage of socialite Martha M. Newkirk. He was also planning to build a bungalow in Beaumont, California. And, in 1909, his work was being exhibited in major art venues and the Kanst gallery in Los Angeles. Later, in 1911, after traveling with Chase on horseback, he contributed 21 realistic line art drawings to Chase's book, Cone-bearing Trees of the California Mountains.

Besides his work in Wonders of the Colorado Desert and Cone-bearing Trees, Eytel contributed (both drawings and articles) to the best periodicals, including the Los Angeles Times  and, for nearly 14 years, the New Yorker Staats-Zeitung. (During his travels in the southwest he became friends with Los Angeles Times city editor Charles Lummis.) A stone wall in the dining room of Dr. Welwood Murray's early hotel was covered with an Eytel mural of Palm Canyon. His hundreds of drawings of native palms were his trademark and he became known as "The Artist of the Palms". His work helped publicize early Palm Springs. In 1977 his works were selling for $10,000 and under.

"Creative Brotherhood"
Along with naturalist Edmund C. Jaeger, and authors Chase and Charles Francis Saunders, Eytel was a core member of what University of Arizona Professor Peter Wild called a "Creative Brotherhood" that lived in Palm Springs in the early 20th century. Other Brotherhood members included cartoonist and painter Swinnerton, author James, and photographers Fred Payne Clatworthy and Stephen H. Willard. The men lived near each other (like Eytel, Jaeger built his own cabin), traveled together throughout the Southwest, helped with each other's works, and exchanged photographs which appeared in their various books.

The Brotherhood lasted from 1915 when Jaeger, who was the teacher in the Palm Springs one-room school house, met Eytel and Chase. It ended in 1923 when Chase died. (In 1924, after completing his studies at Occidental College in Los Angeles, Jaeger began a 30-year teaching career at Riverside Junior College in Riverside, California.) Jaeger wrote the initial eulogy for Eytel upon his death and in 1948, recalling his time with him, Jaeger said:
Over the years it was Eytel who served as their "spiritual figurehead". Even after Jaeger left to complete his studies and Chase married the wealthy Isabel White (1917), the three, plus Saunders, often exchanged letters.
 Suffering from a "hacking and persistent cough", Eytel remained in Palm Springs, impoverished, and Swinnerton would buy art supplies for him. Later Eytel became a recluse.

Smoketree School

Journalist Ann Japenga has characterized Eytel's work as "Smoketree School" – a school which is named after a favorite desert art subject, the smoketree. The school has origins with Alson S. Clark and Jack Frost, who were influenced by French impressionist Claude Monet. Other Smoketree artists include Carl Bray, Fred Chisnall, Maynard Dixon, Clyde Forsythe, Sam Hyde Harris, John Hilton, R. Brownell McGrew, Agnes Pelton, Hanson Puthuff and Swinnerton.

Style and subjects

Like many artists of the desert southwest, Eytel's style was impressionistic.  His subjects were varied and included the Mission San José de Tumacácori, in the Tumacácori National Historical Park near Nogales, Arizona (pre-restoration), and California Mission San Gabriel Arcángel and Mission San Juan Capistrano Spanish missions. His drawings for Cone-bearing Trees of the California Mountains and Wonders of the Colorado Desert were especially detailed and included Desert Bighorn Sheep, desert reptiles, and cattle. (His Mirage in the Desert (1905), painted for Wonders, depicts cattle and cowboys.)

Eytel depicted the life of Navajo, Hopi, Cahuilla, Serrano and Kamia peoples, including landscapes of the New Mexico Eight Northern Pueblos in San Ildefonso, Laguna, Tesuque and Taos Pueblo. The Walpi Pueblo on First Mesa, Hopi Reservation, Arizona, and Cocopah people near Calexico, California were drawn as well.

Prospectors working the Anaconda (Dale District) and Manana (Colorado River) mines in Arizona and the famous Picacho gold mine were drawn, as were the Rancho Guajome Adobe near Encinitas, California, the Sierra Bonita Ranch near Fort Grant, Arizona, turn of the century Tucson, Arizona, and the Yuma Territorial Prison, Yuma, Arizona.

His scenes from early Palm Springs included the stagecoach station and William Pester – "The Hermit of Palm Springs".

Eytel's landscapes and mountain scenes in Wonders included:
 Ehrenberg, Arizona
 Algodones, including the Pilot Knob landmark, Imperial County, California
 Palo Verde, Arizona
 San Jacinto National Forest, California
 Oak Creek Canyon, within Coconino National Forest, Arizona
 Mt. San Gorgonio, California
 Mt. San Jacinto, California
 Royal Gorge, Colorado
 San Francisco Peaks near Flagstaff, Arizona
 Sentinel Rock and Cathedral Spires in Yosemite Valley, California
 Tahquitz Peak, near Idyllwild, California
 Twin Buttes, Navajo County, Arizona

Honors

Eytel was a friend of the Cahuilla people and they allowed him to be buried in their cemetery in Palm Springs after he died of tuberculosis in a Banning, California sanatorium. His funeral and burial were arranged by Nellie Coffman, who had established the original Desert Inn in the Palm Springs village in 1909.

Eytel received the following eulogy from Saunders writing in August 1926:
His painting Desert near Palm Springs (1914) is displayed in the California History Room of the California State Library. The Palm Springs Art Museum has a set of Eytel's sketches and displays various of his paintings.

The desert shrub amphipappus fremontii was given the common name "eytelia" in his honor. The short "Via Eytel" in Palm Springs is named in his honor, as is the short "Eytel Road" in nearby Cathedral City.

See also

Art topics:
 En plein air – painting in the open air, which Eytel usually did
 California Plein-Air Painting – early 20th century movement, a regional variation on American Impressionism
 California Art Club – a Plein-Air arts organization founded in 1909, but Eytel was not a member
 California Plein-Air Revival – which began in the 1980s
 Tonalism – painting of landscapes with an overall tone of colored atmosphere or mist, although Eytel's work does not have dark, neutral hues such as gray, brown or blue
 California Tonalism
 Tonal Impressionism

Literature topics:
 Outdoor literature
 Travel literature
Desert topics:
 Coachella Valley – part of the "low desert" in which Eytel lived
 Deserts of California
 Little San Bernardino Mountains, which contain the Joshua Tree National Monument, are north of the Coachella Valley – some of Eytel's travels took him into this area below the California "high desert" (Mojave Desert)
 Puebloan people – Native Americans in the Southwestern pueblos
 Santa Rosa and San Jacinto Mountains – where Eytel painted many of his mountain scenes
 Southwest Museum of the American Indian – founded by Eytel's friend Charles Fletcher Lummis in 1905

Notes and references

Further reading

  – Pearl McCallum McManus was a major figure in the development of early Palm Springs. This book also contains some 26 of Eytel's pen and ink drawings.
 
  
  (Electronic copy)
 
  
  Includes letters with State Librarian James Louis Gillis and Milton J. Ferguson.
  
  
 
 
  – Jaeger credits Eytel for a drawing of Washington Palms in a rocky gorge (p. 82). He also relates a story told to him by Dr. J. H. Kocher when Eytel and Kocher were camping in the mountains at Keyes Ranch near the Colorado Desert – a spotted skunk had come into their tent while they were sleeping. Eytel's advice to Kocher was a whispered "Better keep still." (pp. 288–290).
 
  Also available at: Desert Magazine 1978 September | PDF | Mail | Nature.

External links

 USC Digital Library, Carl Eytel
 Artnet.com: auction results on Carl Eytel  (Contains images of the paintings A Rio Grande Pueblo and Cattle Herding)
 Ask/Art. The Artist's Bluebook: Carl A. Eytel  (Contains biographical material and images of paintings)
 Heritage Auctions: Carl Eytel  (Contains images of the paintings Palm Desert and California Palms, sold at auction.)
 Braun Research Library Collection: Carl Eytel (394 images) Autry National Center, which holds the original drawings by Eytel for The Wonders of the Colorado Desert
 

20th-century American painters
American male painters
American illustrators
American Impressionist painters
American landscape painters
Artists of the American West
Burials in Riverside County, California
German emigrants to the United States
German illustrators
German landscape painters
Painters from California
Artists from Palm Springs, California
Artists from Stuttgart
1862 births
1925 deaths
20th-century American male artists